Bald Mountain Brook is a stream located in New York, in the Town of Webb in Herkimer County, northeast of Old Forge.

References

Rivers of Herkimer County, New York
Rivers of New York (state)